Edward Ashe (c. 1673 – 1748) of Heytesbury, Wiltshire was an English landowner, and Member of Parliament for Heytesbury for 52 years, from 1695 to 1747.

Between 1640 to 1750, Heytesbury was continuously represented by a member of the Ashe family. His grandfather, Edward, father, William, brother, and nephew, were also MPs for the seat.

During his time in Parliament, he is recorded as making only one intervention, in 1733. A reliable Whig, and supporter of Robert Walpole, in 1720, he was given a seat on the Board of Trade, which he retained until 1746.

He died on 22 May 1748; he had no children from his marriage to Frances Luttrell, and his estate was inherited by his nephew, William Ashe, 1714 to 1750.

Biography
Edward Ashe was the eldest son of William Ashe, and his first wife Anne Popham, daughter of Alexander Popham, MP of Littlecote, Wiltshire. He had a brother, William (1675-1732), the second MP for Heytesbury from 1708 to 1722, and a sister, Elizabeth (1682-1768). She married Pierce A'Court, (1677-1725); her grandson, William Ashe A'Court, (c.1747-1817), inherited the Heytesbury estate.

In 1710, Edward married Frances Luttrell; they had no children.

Career

He graduated from Wadham College, Oxford on 7 April 1690, and in the 1695 election, was nominated for Heytesbury. His grandfather, Edward, was a wealthy London merchant, who purchased the Heytesbury estate in 1641. The borough returned two MPs, and an Ashe family member, or connection, occupied these continuously from 1640 to 1770. with only 26 voters, only one election from 1690 to 1754 was contested.

Most of Wiltshire supported Parliament in the First English Civil War, while his father was a religious Independent. The Ashes were thus supporters of the 1688 Glorious Revolution, and reliable Whig voters. In 1696, Ashe voted for the execution of Jacobite plotter, Sir John Fenwick.

The Ashes were a large family; in the early 1700s, Edward and another seven direct relatives were MPs. He was also connected by marriage to Viscount 'Turnip' Townshend, Whig Secretary of State for the North, 1714 to 1717. Although out manoeuvred by Walpole for leadership of the party, he and his supporters remained an important faction.

As a result, Ashe held a number of government posts; he was Storekeeper of the Ordnance from 1710 until 1712, when he was removed by the 1713 Tory government. Restored by the Whigs as Clerk of the Ordnance in 1714, he lost office again when Townshend was defeated by his Whig rivals in 1718. Eventually, he was appointed to the Board of Trade, which he retained until 1746, although he played very little part in its activities. His lengthy service meant that he was briefly Father of the House.

He resigned his offices in 1746, on grounds of ill-health, and died on 22 May 1748; he was buried at St Peter and St Paul, Heytesbury.

References

Sources
 
 
 
 
 

1670s births
1748 deaths
Members of the Parliament of Great Britain for constituencies in Wiltshire
Alumni of Wadham College, Oxford
Whig members of the Parliament of Great Britain
English MPs 1695–1698
English MPs 1698–1700
English MPs 1701–1702
English MPs 1702–1705
English MPs 1705–1707
British MPs 1707–1708
British MPs 1708–1710
British MPs 1710–1713
British MPs 1713–1715
British MPs 1715–1722
British MPs 1722–1727
British MPs 1727–1734
British MPs 1734–1741
British MPs 1741–1747
Members of the pre-1707 English Parliament for constituencies in Wiltshire
Whig members of the pre-1707 English Parliament